The Sor Brook is a brook located mostly in Oxfordshire, in the South of England.

From its source at Edge Hill in Warwickshire, it flows to the west of Banbury past Broughton Castle and Adderbury to its confluence with the River Cherwell.

References

Rivers of Oxfordshire
Rivers of Warwickshire
2Sor